The Platino Award for Best Supporting Actress in a Miniseries or TV series (Spanish: Mejor Interpretación Femenina de Reparto en Miniserie o Teleserie) is one of the Platino Awards, Ibero-America's film awards  presented annually by the Entidad de Gestión de Derechos de los Productores Audiovisuales (EGEDA) and the Federación Iberoamericana de Productores Cinematográficos y Audiovisuales (FIPCA). 

The category was first introduced alongside the Platino Award for Best Supporting Actor in a Miniseries or TV series category in 2020 at the 7th Platino Awards. Spanish actress Alba Flores was the first recipient of the award for her role as Ágata Jiménez (Nairobi) in Money Heist. No actress has won this award more than once while Najwa Nimri is the only actress who has been nominated multiple times in the category with two nominations.

In the list below the winner of the award for each year is shown first, followed by the other nominees.

Winners and nominees

2020s

See also
 Latin American television awards

References

External links
Official site

Platino Awards
Television awards for Best Supporting Actress